Angelos Tsolakis (born 23 August 1969) is a retired Cypriot football striker.

References

1969 births
Living people
Cypriot footballers
Apollon Limassol FC players
AEL Limassol players
Olympiakos Nicosia players
Association football forwards
Cyprus international footballers